The Bijlmermeer, or colloquially Bijlmer, is one of the neighbourhoods that form the Amsterdam-Zuidoost borough (Dutch: stadsdeel) of Amsterdam, Netherlands. To many people, the Bijlmer designation is used to refer to Amsterdam Zuidoost as a pars pro toto. The other neighbourhoods in Amsterdam Zuidoost are Gaasperdam, Bullewijk, Venserpolder and Driemond.

The Bijlmermeer neighbourhood, which today houses almost 50,000 people of over 150 nationalities, was designed as a single project as part of a then innovative Modernist approach to urban design. Led by architect Siegfried Nassuth and team, the original neighbourhood was designed as a series of nearly identical high-rise buildings laid out in a hexagonal grid. The goal was to create open spaces for recreation at grade, elevated roads to reduce pollution and traffic from those same recreation areas, and residences climbing upward offering residents views, clean air, and sunlight. The apartments were meant to attract a suburban population, in the manner of condominium housing. The buildings have several features that distinguish them from traditional Dutch high-rise flats, such as tubular walkways connecting the flats and garages. The blocks are separated by large green areas planted with grass and trees. Each flat has its own garages where cars can be parked.

The Bijlmer was designed with two levels of traffic. Cars drive on the top level, the decks of which fly over the lower levels, pedestrian avenues and bicycle paths. This separation of fast and slow moving traffic is conducive to traffic safety. However, in recent years, the roads are once again being put into a single plane, so pedestrians, cycles and cars travel alongside each other. This is a move to lessen the effects of the 'inhuman' scale of some of the Bijlmer's designs and improve safety using direct sightlines.

Because of the Bijlmer's peripheral position relative to the city centre, it was decided that metro lines would be built connecting the Bijlmer with other neighbourhoods. The Oostlijn (east line, comprising two lines, numbered 53 and 54) links the Bijlmer to the Central Station of Amsterdam, while the Ringlijn  links it with the port area at Sloterdijk.

Social Issues

Until recently, Bijlmermeer struggled to draw in many middle-class families. Following Suriname's independence in 1975, many of its inhabitants migrated to the Netherlands. The government placed a substantial number of them in affordable social housing in the Bijlmermeer.

The neighbourhood once had a very high crime rate, but this has decreased dramatically in recent years. The number of registered complaints to the police decreased from 20,000 in 1995 (of which 2,000 were robberies) to 8,000 (of which 600 were robberies) in 2005.

The area has always been home to many different nationalities simultaneously. Throughout the years, claims of rising social segregation or ghettoization have been both denied and pre-empted by local government.

Urban renewal
After El Al Flight 1862 crashed into two Bijlmermeer buildings in 1992, an incident known as the Bijlmerramp (Dutch for "Bijlmer Disaster"), it was decided that the neighbourhood needed some further change. In recent years, many of the high rise buildings have been renovated or torn down. More expensive low-rise housing has been built to attract more middle- and upper-income residents. This resulted in significant reduction in crime and a more balanced socio-economic composition, whilst at the same time maintaining the area's ethnic mix. Lately students have discovered the Bijlmer as an affordable place to live compared to the city centre where space is limited and costs of living are high.

Events and sights
Amsterdam Zuidoost is host to Ajax Amsterdam's ArenA football stadium, which hosts football matches and musical concerts, the Pathé ArenA multiplex cinema with 14 screens, the Heineken Music Hall and music and theatres, located in the business park area of Amsterdam Zuidoost, just to the west of the Bijlmer. The recreational strip is called the ArenA Boulevard. The strip mostly hosts concerts, with a very small number of bars and no night clubs. It has not been able to compete with Amsterdam's city centre for the casual Saturday night crowd. 

The Bijlmer boasts Amsterdam's biggest shopping centre, the "Amsterdamse Poort", though Amsterdam's city centre remains the largest shopping area. Alongside the shopping centre, the "Anton de Kom plein" (square) is completed, it houses a cultural centre and the borough administrative offices ("stadsdeelkantoor").

In 2012 the entire area from the Ziggo Dome in the west, Villa Arena home furnishings mall, the ArenA Boulevard and stadium, and the Amsterdamse Poort started being marketed as "ArenaPoort".

The  mixed-use GETZ Entertainment Centre is planned to open on the ArenA Boulevard, including retail, catering industry, leisure, several types of entertainment, a hotel and a culture cluster.

The annual Kwaku Summer Festival is a six-weekend long multicultural festival during the summer, with Surinamese, Antillean and African food, music and other events.

The De Boom Die Alles Zag tree (The Tree That Saw Everything or The Tree That Saw It All) is a notable grey poplar tree and monument located in Bijlmermeer that survived the crash of El Al Flight 1862 on 4 October 1992.

Bijlmer art crime scene 

The presence of randomly placed art remains a bone of contention for residents of the Bijlmermeer. Artist Arico Caravan placed a small statue of Martin Luther King Jr. next to an existing statue of Anton de Kom. The original statue of Anton de Kom has received considerable criticism for its reproduction of tropes concerning black masculinity. In response to recent interventions by local artists and activist under the hashtag #Bijlmerartcrimescene, a group of local financial institutions have shown interest in addressing the matter.

Notable residents
Ryan Babel, footballer
Kevin Bobson, footballer
Remy Bonjasky, kickboxer
Lucien Carbin, kickboxer
Mitchell Donald, footballer
Steve van Dorpel, footballer
Akwasi Frimpong, sprinter
Cerezo Fung-a-Wing, footballer
Ortwin Linger, footballer
Javier Martina, footballer
Tyrone Spong, kickboxer
Gilbert Yvel, mixed martial artist
Gloria Wekker, academic, writer
:nl:Mani (rapper), rapper

See also

Amsterdam Bijlmer ArenA railway station
 Klushuis

External links
 "Bijlmer (City of the Future, Part One) -99% Invisible Podcast"
 "Blood, Sweat & Tears (City of the Future, Part Two) - 99% Invisible Podcast"
 "The Development of Amsterdam Southeast", Amsterdam Zuidoost borough government

Footnotes and references 

Former municipalities of North Holland
Neighbourhoods of Amsterdam
Polders of North Holland
Mixed-use developments in the Netherlands
Amsterdam-Zuidoost